Hepatology is the branch of medicine that incorporates the study of liver, gallbladder, biliary tree, and pancreas as well as management of their disorders. Although traditionally considered a sub-specialty of gastroenterology, rapid expansion has led in some countries to doctors specializing solely on this area, who are called hepatologists.

Diseases and complications related to viral hepatitis and alcohol are the main reason for seeking specialist advice. More than two billion people have been infected with hepatitis B virus at some point in their life, and approximately 350 million have become persistent carriers.  Up to 80% of liver cancers can be attributed to either hepatitis B or hepatitis C virus. In terms of mortality, the former is second only to smoking among known agents causing cancer. With more widespread implementation of vaccination and strict screening before blood transfusion, lower infection rates are expected in the future. In many countries, however, overall alcohol consumption is increasing, and consequently the number of people with cirrhosis and other related complications is commensurately increasing.

Scope of specialty
As for many medical specialties, patients are most likely to be referred by family physicians (i.e., GP) or by physicians from different disciplines. The reasons might be:
 Drug overdose. Paracetamol overdose is common.
 Gastrointestinal bleeding from portal hypertension related to liver damage
 Abnormal blood test suggesting liver disease
 Enzyme defects leading to bigger liver in children commonly named storage disease of liver
 Jaundice / Hepatitis virus positivity in blood, perhaps discovered on screening blood tests
 Ascites or swelling of abdomen from fluid accumulation, commonly due to liver disease but can be from other diseases like heart failure
 All patients with advanced liver disease e.g. cirrhosis should be under specialist care
 To undergo ERCP for diagnosing diseases of biliary tree or their management
 Fever with other features suggestive of infection involving mentioned organs. Some exotic tropical diseases like hydatid cyst, kala-azar or schistosomiasis may be suspected. Microbiologists would be involved as well
 Systemic diseases affecting liver and biliary tree e.g. haemochromatosis
 Follow up of liver transplant
 Pancreatitis - commonly due to alcohol or gallstone
 Cancer of above organs. Usually multi-disciplinary approach is undertaken with involvement of oncologist and other experts.

History

Evidence from autopsies on Egyptian mummies suggests that liver damage from the parasitic infection bilharziasis was widespread in the ancient society.
It is possible that the Greeks may have been aware of the liver's ability to exponentially duplicate as illustrated by the story of Prometheus. However, knowledge about liver disease in antiquity is questionable. Most of the important advances in the field have been made in the last 50 years.
 In 400 BC Hippocrates mentioned liver abscess in aphorisms.
 Roman anatomist Galen thought the liver was the principal organ of the body. He also identified its relationship with the gallbladder and spleen.
 Around 100 CE Aretaeus of Cappadocia wrote on jaundice
 In the medieval period Avicenna noted the importance of urine in diagnosing liver conditions.
 In 1770, French anatomist Antoine Portal noted bleeding due to oesophageal varices,
 In 1844, Gabriel Valentin showed pancreatic juices break down food in digestion.
 1846 Justus Von Leibig discovered pancreatic juice tyrosine
 1862 Austin Flint described the production of "stercorin".
 1875 Victor Charles Hanot described cirrhotic jaundice and other diseases of the liver
 In 1958, Moore developed a standard technique for canine orthotopic liver transplantation.
 The first human liver transplant was performed in 1963 by Dr. Thomas E. Starzl on a three-year-old male afflicted with biliary atresia after perfecting the technique on canine livers.
 Baruch S. Blumberg discovered hepatitis B virus in 1966 and developed the first vaccine against it 1969. He was awarded the Nobel Prize in Physiology or Medicine 1976.
 In 1989, investigators from the CDC (Daniel W. Bradley) and Chiron (Michael Houghton) identified the hepatitis C virus, which had previously been known as non-A, non-B hepatitis and could not be detected in the blood supply.
 Only in 1992 was a blood test created that could detect hepatitis C in donated blood.

The word hepatology is from Ancient Greek ἧπαρ (hepar) or  ἡπατο- (hepato-), meaning "liver", and -λογία (-logia), meaning "study".

Disease classification
1. International Classification of Disease (ICD 2007) – WHO classification:
 Chapter XI: Diseases of the digestive system
 K70-K77 Diseases of liver
 K80-K87 Disorders of gallbladder, biliary tract and pancreas

2. MeSH (medical subject heading):sam
 G02.403.776.409.405 same as "Gastroenterology"
 C06.552 Liver Diseases
 C06.130 Biliary Tract Diseases
 C06.689 Pancreatic diseases

3. National Library of Medicine Catalogue
 WI 700-740 Liver and biliary tree Diseases
 WI 800-830 Pancrease
Also see Hepato-biliary diseases

Important procedures
 Endoscopic retrograde cholangiopancreatography (ERCP)
 Transhepatic pancreato-cholangiography (TPC)
 Transjugular intrahepatic portosystemic shunt (TIPSS)
 Liver transplant and pancreas transplant

References

 
Gastroenterology